is a Japanese former figure skater. She was born in Chiba. She is the 2008 JGP Czech Skate champion, 2009 JGP Final silver medalist, and 2010 Japanese junior bronze medalist.

Programs

Competitive highlights
JGP: ISU Junior Grand Prix

Detailed results

References

 Japan Novice Championships 2007-2008
 Japan Junior Figure Skating Championships 2009

External links

Japanese female single skaters
1995 births
Living people
People from Chiba (city)